Sherali Juraev (born 13 December 1986) is a Uzbekistani judoka.

He competed at the 2016 Summer Olympics in Rio de Janeiro, in the men's 90 kg.

References

External links
 
 

1986 births
Living people
Uzbekistani male judoka
Olympic judoka of Uzbekistan
Judoka at the 2016 Summer Olympics
Universiade medalists in judo
Judoka at the 2018 Asian Games
Asian Games bronze medalists for Uzbekistan
Asian Games medalists in judo
Medalists at the 2018 Asian Games
Universiade silver medalists for Uzbekistan
Medalists at the 2011 Summer Universiade
20th-century Uzbekistani people
21st-century Uzbekistani people